PAMO may refer to:

 Mountain Village Airport, ICAO code
 Phenylacetone monooxygenase, an enzyme